Whispering Smith Rides is a 1927 American silent Western film serial directed by Ray Taylor. The screenplay was written by Arthur Henry Gooden, based on a novel by Frank H. Spearman. The film is considered to be lost, but a trailer is held for this serial at the Library of Congress.

Cast
 Wallace MacDonald as Whispering Smith
 Rose Blossom
 J. P. McGowan
 Clark Comstock
 Henry Hebert
 Merrill McCormick (as W.M. McCormick)
 Harry Todd
 Willie Fung
 Frank Ellis

Chapter titles
Lawless Men
Caught in the Crash
Trapped
The Ambush
Railroad Gold
The Interrupted Wedding
A Coward of Conscience
The Bandit’s Bargain
The Trail of Sacrifice
A Call of the Hear
Source:

See also
 List of film serials
 List of film serials by studio

References

External links
 

1927 films
1927 lost films
1927 Western (genre) films
American silent serial films
American black-and-white films
Films directed by Ray Taylor
Lost Western (genre) films
Lost American films
Silent American Western (genre) films
Universal Pictures film serials
1920s American films
1920s English-language films